Virginia's 90th House of Delegates district elects one of the 100 members of the Virginia House of Delegates, the lower house of the state's bicameral legislature. The district is made up of parts of the cities of Norfolk and Virginia Beach.

The 90th delegate seat was held by Joseph C. Lindsey from 2014 until his 2020 retirement to accept a judgeship. Angelia Williams Graves was sworn in after winning a 2021 special election.

District officeholders

Electoral history

References

Virginia House of Delegates districts
Norfolk, Virginia
Virginia Beach, Virginia